Xungba is a township in the Tibet Autonomous Region of China.  The township falls under the jurisdiction of Ngamring County in Shigatse Prefecture.

See also
List of towns and villages in Tibet

Populated places in Shigatse
Township-level divisions of Tibet